Stephen J. Maranian is a United States Army major general who commands the 56th Artillery Command. Commissioned in 1988 as a Field Artillery officer, Maranian has served continuously on active duty, commanding from the platoon to the two-star level. He has served in combat deployments in Afghanistan and Iraq. More than half of his career has been spent overseas as of 2022. Maranian holds two master's degrees as a graduate of the United States Army Command and General Staff College and the United States Army War College; he has also graduated from the NATO Defense College and the Defense Language Institute.

His previous General Officer commands include serving as commandant of the United States Army War College from July 2020 to August 2021, and as commandant of the United States Army Field Artillery School from June 2016 to May 2018 while dual-hatted as director of the Long Range Precision Fires Cross-Functional Team from October 2017 to May 2018. Other assignments as a General Officer include serving as the deputy commanding general of the 2nd Infantry Division in South Korea from May 2018 to May 2019 and as the deputy commanding general for education of the United States Army Combined Arms Center, provost of the Army University, and deputy commandant of the U.S. Army Command and General Staff College from June 2019 to July 2020.

In August 2021, Maranian was selected to activate and command the 56th Artillery Command in Germany; the senior Artillery command in the European/African Area of responsibility, and activated the 56th on November 8, 2021.

Education

Maranian grew up in Natick, Massachusetts, where he attended elementary through high school. He graduated from Bucknell University in 1988 with a Bachelor's degree in Business Administration. Maranian holds two Master's degrees and is a graduate of the United States Army Command and General Staff College and the U.S. Army War College, the latter where he served as the student class president. He also attended the NATO Defense College, and the Greek Language Course (honor graduate) at the Defense Language Institute.

Career
Commissioned as a Field Artillery officer in 1988, Maranian has commanded units from the platoon to the brigade level. He is a combat veteran, with deployments to Afghanistan and Iraq, having eleven total overseas tours. As of 2022, more than half of his career has been spent in overseas tours or deployments.

Maranian's commands began at the battery level with two units in the 1st Cavalry Division: Headquarters and Headquarters Battery, Division Artillery, and Battery C, 2nd Battalion, 82nd Field Artillery—both in Fort Hood, Texas, and the latter also in Kuwait. His battalion command was with the 4-319th Airborne Field Artillery Regiment within the 173rd Airborne Brigade in Bamberg, Germany and forward deployed for 15 months to Afghanistan. He also commanded the 19th Battlefield Coordination Detachment at Ramstein Air Base in Germany.

In 2015–2016, Maranian served as the chief of staff of the U.S. Army Africa/Southern European Task Force in Italy, participating in events such as the African Land Forces Summit 2016. In June 2016, Maranian transitioned to become the commandant of the Field Artillery School and chief of Field Artillery at Ft. Sill, Oklahoma. Subsequently, he served as the Director for the U.S. Army's Long Range Precision Fires (LRPF) Cross-Functional Team through May 2018, which comprised members of organizations from across the U.S. Army and Marine Corps with the purpose of focusing of modernizing "field artillery forces to be able to deliver lethal, long-range precision fires in order to be able to compete, deter and win on the modern battlefield". His following assignment was as the deputy commanding general for maneuver of the 2nd Infantry Division in South Korea. In June 2019, Maranian assumed the post of Combined Arms Center–Education deputy commanding general, Army University provost and CGSC deputy commandant.

In July 2020, he assumed the duties as the commandant of the U.S. Army War College in Carlisle, Pennsylvania. With the school's provost, MG Maranian "directed revisions and innovations in curriculum and teaching methodologies; and hired faculty with expertise in emerging issues, e.g., futures, data analysis, and environmental security". Also, under his tenure, the "Strategic Studies Institute and Center for Strategic Leadership refocused their ideas and expertise in analysis and experimentation to align with pressing strategic issues".

Maranian was suspended as commandant on February 9, 2021 amid a false allegation of "inappropriate touching"  The Army's Criminal Investigation Division's (CID's) examination "was led by an 'experienced, civilian investigator' who had worked on some 700 sexual assault cases during the last 18 years. It included interviews with 16 witnesses." The Army stated that, "After CID completed the investigation, they referred the case to an independent special victim prosecutor, as well as a former civilian prosecutor with 30 years’ experience who works as a highly qualified expert for the U.S. Army." On July 21, 2021, Maranian was reinstated as commandant, as the CID determined that there was "no probable cause" that the offense had occurred. The Army War College stated that, following the reinstatement, Maranian met with his staff and resumed his duties.

In August 2021, the Chief of Staff of the Army announced that he would be assigned as the commanding general of the 56th Field Artillery Command. He relinquished command of the Army War College to Major General David C. Hill on August 31, 2021  and assumed command of the 56th Artillery Command on November 8, 2021. As commanding general of the 56th Artillery Command, Maranian focused the command on building interoperability with NATO Allies through personal engagement with the senior leaders of NATO armies, and through the unit's exercise program. During 2022, the 56th's exercises tested new concepts for linking artillery forces. During Exercise Dynamic Front '22 in July, 2022  the unit successfully paired a U.S. artillery brigade with a multinational fires brigade comprising 11 nations, with NATO’s Allied Rapid Reaction Corps providing command and control; a notable "first". Maranian's interoperability efforts were notable in the high north, visiting Scandinavian and Baltic nations and exercising interoperability in bi-lateral training events. In early 2023, Maranian continued efforts to enhance NATO armies’ artillery interoperability visiting several Allied nations, hosting an International Fires Warfighting Forum in Wiesbaden, Germany, and setting conditions for the Dynamic Front 2023 Exercise in Grafenwöhr, Germany and Oxbøl, Denmark.

Notes

References 

Year of birth missing (living people)
Living people
Date of birth missing (living people)
People from Natick, Massachusetts
Military personnel from Massachusetts
Bucknell University alumni
Webster University alumni
United States Army Command and General Staff College alumni
United States Army War College alumni
Defense Language Institute alumni
United States Army generals